Kameelrivier Stadium is a stadium in Kameelrivier.

The stadium is used for  football matches and is the home venue of TS Galaxy, who will compete in the 2020–21 South African Premier Division.

References

Sports venues in Mpumalanga
Soccer venues in South Africa